William Henry Mitchell (20 January 1859 – 16 November 1929) was an English cricketer.  Mitchell's batting and bowling styles are unknown.  He was born at Arundel, Sussex.

Mitchell made two first-class appearances for Sussex in 1886 against Kent at County Ground, Hove and Nottinghamshire at Trent Bridge.  Against Kent, Mitchell scored 3 runs in Sussex's first-innings before being dismissed by Jimmy Wootton.  In Sussex's second-innings he was dismissed by the same bowler for a duck, with Kent winning the match by 4 wickets.  Against Nottinghamshire, he was dismissed for a single run in Sussex's first-innings by Wilfred Flowers.  In their second-innings he was dismissed by William Attewell for 4 runs, with Nottinghamshire winning by an innings and 15 runs.

He died at Southwater, Sussex on 16 November 1929.

References

External links
William Mitchell at ESPNcricinfo
William Mitchell at CricketArchive

1859 births
1929 deaths
People from Arundel
English cricketers
Sussex cricketers
People from Southwater